The 2003 South Lakeland District Council election took place on 1 May 2003 to elect members of South Lakeland District Council in Cumbria, England. One third of the council was up for election and the council stayed under no overall control.

After the election, the composition of the council was:
Liberal Democrat 23
Conservative 18
Labour 9
Independent 2

Background
Before the election the Liberal Democrats had 21 seats, the Conservatives 19, Labour 9 and independents 3. 17 seats were being contested with the Conservatives defending 10, the Liberal Democrats 6 and an independent 1 seat. 2 sitting Liberal Democrat councillors stood down at the election, Patricia Himsworth in Arnside and Beetham, and Claire Chorley in Burneside.

Major issues in the election included housing, regeneration, recycling, public toilets, affordable transport and refuse collection.

Election result
The results saw the Liberal Democrats remain the largest party with 23 seats, but without a majority, after gaining 2 seats from the Conservatives in Cartmel and Low Furness & Swarthmoor and 1 seat from an independent in Whinfell. However the Conservatives did take 1 seat back from the Liberal Democrats in Arnside & Beetham to hold 18 seats. Labour remained on 9 seats, while independents dropped to 2 seats. Overall turnout in the election was 44%, with a low of 33.9% in Windermere Applethwaite to a high of 54.2% in Kirkby Lonsdale.

Ward results

Joss Curwen was originally elected as a Liberal Democrat councillor.

Leslie Hadwin was originally elected unopposed as an Independent councillor.

John Manning had previously been elected in a by-election.

William Tyson had been elected at a by-election for the Conservative Party.

References

2003
2003 English local elections
2000s in Cumbria